Chen Yan or Yan Chen may refer to the following people surnamed Chen:
 Chen Yan (died 891), governor of Fujian during the Tang dynasty
 , Ming dynasty mandarin
 Chen Yan (born 1979), female Chinese backstroke swimmer
Yan Chen (born 1966), Chinese American behavioral and experimental economist
 Chen Yan (born 1981), female Chinese individual medley and freestyle swimmer
 Yedda Chen (born 1984), Chinese model, singer and actress